Elveflya (The River Plain) is a coastal plain in Wedel Jarlsberg Land at Spitsbergen, Svalbard. It is located between Nottinghambukta and the front of Torellbreen, west of the mountain Tonefjellet. The plain has a width of about five kilometers, and is characterized by moraine deposits and rivers.

References

Plains of Spitsbergen